The 2012 Greek Cup Final was the 68th final of the Greek Football Cup. It took place on 28 April 2012 at Olympic Stadium, between Atromitos and Olympiacos. It was the second consecutive Greek Cup Final for Atromitos, in their 89 years of existence and Olympiacos' thirty sixth Greek Cup Final of their 87-year history.

Venue

This was the nineteenth Greek Cup Final held at the Athens Olympic Stadium, after the 1983, 1984, 1985, 1986, 1987, 1988, 1989, 1990, 1993, 1994, 1995, 1996, 1999, 2000, 2002, 2009, 2010 and 2011 finals.

The Athens Olympic Stadium was built in 1982 and renovated once in 2004. The stadium is used as a venue for AEK Athens and Panathinaikos and was used for Olympiacos and Greece in various occasions. Its current capacity is 69,618 and hosted 3 UEFA European Cup/Champions League Finals in 1983, 1994 and 2007, a UEFA Cup Winners' Cup Final in 1987, the 1991 Mediterranean Games and the 2004 Summer Olympics.

Background
Atromitos qualified for the Greek Cup Final 2011; they lost to AEK Athens, 0–3.

Olympiacos qualified for the Greek Cup Final thirty five times, winning twenty four of them. They last played in a Final in 2009; they won AEK Athens by 15–14 on a penalty shootout, which came after a 4–4 draw at the end of the extra time.

Route to the final

Match

Details

References

External links
 Hellenic Football Association - Greek cup 2011-2012

2012
Cup Final
Greek Cup Final 2012
Greek Cup Final 2012
Sports competitions in Athens
April 2012 sports events in Europe